The Imperial Order of Solomon was an order of knighthood of the Ethiopian Empire founded in 1874. A special class Collar was created by Empress Zauditu in 1922. It was a split off from the Order of the Seal of Solomon and created as an independent order with a single grade of "Collar" by Emperor Haile Selassie I in 1930. Members are identified as a "Knight" of the Order of Solomon, with the use the post-nominal initials KS.

The Collar of the Order of Solomon is reserved for the Emperor and Empress, members of the Imperial Family, Foreign Sovereigns, and a maximum of three ordinary recipients who have rendered exceptionally meritorious services. Recipients were entitled to wear special ceremonial robes on "collar days". 

The Solomonic dynasty, the ancient Imperial House of Ethiopia, claims descent from King Solomon and the Queen of Sheba, said to have given birth to King Menelik I after her visit to Solomon in Jerusalem.

As the Empire's principal Order, it featured first in the long list of knightly titles of the last ruling Emperor of Ethiopia, Haile Selassie, described as –

Insignia
When the Emperor Yohannes IV awarded the Order to Admiral Sir William Hewett, c. 1884, it was described as "a gold triangular medal with six precious stones".

References

External links
 The Imperial Orders and Decorations of Ethiopia: the Order of Solomon - website of  the Crown Council of Ethiopia
 Ethiopia: The Order of Solomon - website Medals of the World

Solomon
Solomon
Orders, decorations, and medals of Ethiopia
Awards established in 1930
Orders of chivalry awarded to heads of state, consorts and sovereign family members
1930 establishments in Ethiopia